The Puerto Rico Adjutant General is the commander of the Puerto Rico National Guard. As the adjutant general he is also the senior military advisor to the Governor of Puerto Rico and oversees both State and Federal Missions of the Puerto Rico National Guard. He provides leadership and management in the implementation of all programs and policies affecting more than 10,500 citizen-soldiers and airmen, and civilian employees of the three components of the PR National Guard: Puerto Rico Army National Guard, Puerto Rico Air National Guard and Puerto Rico State Guard. It is the responsibility of the Adjutant General of the Commonwealth to share his reports with the Secretary of the Army or the Secretary of the Air Force.

The adjutant general has a deputy adjutant general, who is the principal advisor assisting in the discharge of responsibilities in the areas of logistics, fiscal compliance, and personnel administration.

History
In 1906, a group of Puerto Ricans met with the United States appointed Governor of Puerto Rico Beekman Winthrop, and suggested the organization of a Puerto Rican National Guard. The petition failed because the U.S. Constitution prohibits the formation of any armed force within the United States and its territories without the authorization of Congress.

Puerto Ricans served in the "Porto Rico Regiment" (later renamed 65th Infantry Regiment) as part of the regular United States Army during World War I, many of which received their military training at Camp Las Casas in Santurce a sector of San Juan, Puerto Rico. Luis R. Esteves, the first Puerto Rican to graduate from the United States Military Academy, helped organize the 23rd Battalion, which would be composed of Puerto Ricans and be stationed in Panama during World War I.

It became apparent to Esteves that Puerto Rico was in need of a National Guard. Esteves and various officers took up the matter with then U.S.-appointed governor of Puerto Rico Arthur Yager after the war. Esteves' efforts were successful and with the approval of the Governor and the Insular Legislature, the Puerto Rican National Guard was organized in 1919.

In 1919, Governor Yager named Major John A. Wilson (U.S. Army) the first adjutant of Puerto Rico. The Adjutant is a military rank or appointment. The position did not require that Wilson hold the rank of general. The appointment of the Adjutant of Puerto Rico was the responsibility of the Governor. As such, he assisted the Governor in military matters. Major Wilson served as Adjutant of Puerto Rico until his death in 1938.

Major General Luis Raul Esteves, was the first commanding officer of the Puerto Rico National Guard, and in 1938, became the first "Adjutant General", a position which he held until his retirement on June 30, 1957. As adjutant general he was the Governor's senior military adviser and oversaw both state and federal missions of the Puerto Rico National Guard.

Adjutant General appointments: 2015 - present
In July 2015, Puerto Rico Governor Alejandro Garcia Padilla named Colonel Martha Carcana Adjutant General of the Puerto Rican National Guard. She is the first Puerto Rican woman to be named as such.

In January 2017, Brigadier General Isabelo Rivera was named adjutant general by Governor Ricardo Rosselló.

Commands
Among the units under the command of the Adjutant Generals command are the following:

Puerto Rico National Guard
 Puerto Rico Army National Guard
92nd Maneuver Enhancement Brigade
101st Troop Command
191st Regional Support Group
 Puerto Rico Air National Guard
 156th Airlift Wing 
 Puerto Rico State Guard

Former generals

The following are the former and current Adjutant Generals of Puerto Rico:

Gallery

See also

Military history of Puerto Rico
List of Puerto Rican military personnel
65th Infantry
Mihiel Gilormini
Alberto A. Nido 
José Antonio Muñiz
José M. Portela

Further reading
Military notes on Puerto Rico (1898); Author: United States. Adjutant-general's office. Military information div.; Publisher: Washington, Gov't print. off.; Call number: 9599782; Digitizing sponsor: The Library of Congress; Book contributor: The Library of Congress;Collection: library_of_congress; Americana.

Notes

References

Puerto Rico Commission on Safety and Public Protection
Puerto Rico National Guard
Adjutants general of the National Guard of the United States
1938 establishments in Puerto Rico